St Andrews FC, Saint Andrew's F.C., or St. Andrews F.C. may refer to the following football clubs:
 St Andrews F.C. (England), based in Aylestone, Leicester, England
 St Andrews F.C. (London), based in London, England 
 St. Andrews F.C. (Malta), based in St. Andrew's, Pembroke, Malta
 St. Andrew's F.C. (Gozo), based in Fontana, Gozo, Malta
 Luqa St. Andrew's F.C., based in Luqa, Malta
 St. Andrew's Athletic Club, Barracas, Buenos Aires, Argentina
 St Andrews University F.C., St Andrews, Scotland
 St Andrews United F.C., St Andrews, Scotland
 Presteigne St. Andrews F.C., Presteigne, Wales
 St. Andrews FC, now called Red Sox Manawatu, Palmerston North, New Zealand

See also
 St Andrew's (stadium), home of Birmingham City F.C.
 Luxol St Andrews Futsal Club, St Andrews, Malta
 University of St Andrews RFC, St Andrews, Scotland
 St. Andrews Knights football, St. Andrews University, Laurinburg, North Carolina, USA